Killea may refer to:

Places
Killea, County Donegal, Ireland
Killea, County Tipperary, Ireland

People with the surname
Lucy Killea (1932–2017), American politician